The Premium Point-to-Point (P2P) Bus Service, formerly known as Express Connect, is an express bus service in the Philippines administered by the Department of Transportation and operated by private bus companies in partnership with the Land Transportation Franchising and Regulatory Board.

Introduced in March 2015, the service was initially available in Metro Manila connecting the city's suburbs to the central business districts, including the Makati CBD, Ortigas Center, and Bonifacio Global City. In February 2016, the express bus service to Manila International Airport was launched with the franchise awarded to Air Freight 2100 (UBE Express). The service runs 24 hours a day with scheduled stops at the Bay City and the Makati CBD. In September 2017, the land transportation board announced services to Clark International Airport in Pampanga with three new routes provided by Genesis Transport.

As of March 2019, the Department of Transportation's premium P2P bus service runs 31 routes across 52 stops in Metro Manila and nearby suburbs in the Greater Manila Area. Services also began operations in the Visayas and other areas in Luzon in the same year.

Express bus routes
In March 2019, the Land Transportation Franchising and Regulatory Board announced the opening of 28 new routes, including new services in Metro Manila, Metro Baguio, Metro Angeles, Metro Iloilo, Metro Cebu, and Greater Manila Area. These routes were launched during the nationwide simultaneous launch of the Public Utility Vehicle Modernization Program (PUVMP) dated July 11, 2019 by this government agency.

Baguio

Cebu metropolitan area

Central Luzon

Iloilo City

References

External links
 Official website of Premium Point-to-Point (P2P) Bus Service

Bus transportation in the Philippines
Department of Transportation (Philippines)